Narra, officially the Municipality of Narra,  is a 1st class municipality in the province of Palawan, Philippines. According to the 2020 census, it has a population of 77,948 people.

Besides spelling out the local name for the Pterocarpus indicus—the Philippines' national tree—it is an acronym for National Resettlement Rehabilitation Administration. This program, established on June 18, 1954, resettled landless people from Luzon to Palawan. On June 21, 1969, the Municipality of Narra was created by virtue of Republic Act No. 5642 signed by President Ferdinand Marcos.

Having a title as "The Rice Granary of Palawan" Municipality of Narra is the main rice producer of the Province of Palawan. The municipality also held "Palay Festival" (Formerly called as "Anihan(Reaping) Festival") held every middle or end week of the October.

Narra also includes Rasa Island, home of the endangered endemic cockatoo species called "Katala or Abukay or Kalangay (depends on local dialect)" or Philippine red-vented cockatoo (cacatua haematuropygia) and other rare animal species.

Geography

Barangays
Narra is politically subdivided into 23 barangays.

Climate

Demographics

Economy

Gallery

References

External links
Narra Profile at PhilAtlas.com
[ Philippine Standard Geographic Code]
Philippine Census Information
Local Governance Performance Management System

Municipalities of Palawan